Emma Bading (born March 12, 1998) is a German actress. She was nominated for an International Emmy Award for Best Performance by an Actress for her role in the TV film .

Filmography
 2013: 
 2014: Weiter als der Ozean (TV movie)
 since 2014: Der Usedom-Krimi (TV series) → see episodes
 2015: Tatort: Das Muli (TV series)
 2015: Kommissarin Lucas: Der Wald (TV series)
 2015: 
 2016: Wir sind die Rosinskis (TV movie)
 2016: Böser Wolf – Ein Taunuskrimi (TV movie)
 2017: Berlin Syndrom
 2017: Helen Dorn: Verlorene Mädchen (TV series)
 2017: 
 2017: 1000 Arten Regen zu beschreiben
 2018: 
 2018: In My Room
 2018: 
 2019:  (TV movie)
 2021: Dear Thomas
 2021: Westwall

Accolades
48th International Emmy Awards

References

External links 
Emma Bading on IMDb

1998 births
German actresses
German film actresses
20th-century German actresses
Living people